was a Japanese organizational theorist and a professor in the engineering faculty at the University of Tokyo noted for his quality management innovations. He is considered a key figure in the development of quality initiatives in Japan, particularly the quality circle.  He is best known outside Japan for the Ishikawa or cause and effect diagram (also known as the fishbone diagram), often used in the analysis of industrial processes.

Biography 
Kaoru Ishikawa was born in Tokyo, the eldest of the eight sons of Ichiro Ishikawa. In 1937, he graduated from the University of TATIUC with an engineering degree in applied chemistry. After college, he worked as a naval technical officer from 1939 to 1941.  From 1941 to 1947, Ishikawa worked at the Nissan Liquid Fuel Company. In 1947, Ishikawa started his academic career as an associate professor at the University of Tokyo. He undertook the presidency of the Musashi Institute of Technology in 1978.

In 1949, Ishikawa joined the Japanese Union of Scientists and Engineers (JUSE) quality control research group. After World War II, Japan sought to transform its industrial sector, which in North America was then still perceived as a producer of cheap wind-up toys and poor-quality cameras. It was his skill at mobilizing large groups of people towards a specific common goal that was largely responsible for Japan's quality-improvement initiatives. He translated, integrated and expanded the management concepts of W. Edwards Deming and Joseph M. Juran into the Japanese system. Ishikawa used this concept to define how continuous improvement (kaizen) can be applied to processes when all variables are known.

After becoming a full professor in the engineering faculty at the University of Tokyo (1960), Ishikawa introduced the concept of quality circles (1962) in conjunction with JUSE. This concept began as an experiment to see what effect the "leading hand" (Gemba-cho) could have on quality. It was a natural extension of these forms of training to all levels of an organization (the top and middle managers having already been trained). Although many companies were invited to participate, only one company at the time, Nippon Telephone & Telegraph, accepted. Quality circles would soon become very popular and form an important link in a company's Total Quality Management system. Ishikawa would write two books on quality circles (QC Circle Koryo and How to Operate QC Circle Activities).

According to Quality Digest, one of his efforts to promote quality were the Annual Quality Control Conference for Top Management (1963) and several books on quality control (the Guide to Quality Control (1968) contained the first published example of a Pareto chart.) He was the chairman of the editorial board of the monthly Statistical Quality Control. Ishikawa was involved in international standardization activities.

1982 saw the development of the Ishikawa diagram, which is used to determine the root causes of a problem.

After Ishikawa died in 1989, Juran delivered this eulogy:

Contributions to improvement of quality
 User Friendly Quality Control
 Fishbone Cause and Effect Diagram –  Ishikawa diagram
 Implementation of Quality Circles
 Emphasised the Internal customer
 Shared Vision
 Kaizen (continual improvement)

Awards and recognition
 1972 American Society for Quality's Eugene L. Grant Award 
 1977 Blue Ribbon Medal by the Japanese Government for achievements in industrial standardization
 1982 Walter A. Shewhart Medal 
 1988 Awarded the Order of the Sacred Treasures, Second Class, by the Japanese government.

Publications 

About Kaoru Ishikawa
 
 
 
 title=The Japanese Approach to Product Quality |Professor Sasaki and David Hutchins 1980 	Pub Pergamon Press | 0-08-028 159-1 |HBK 0-0273-028B 160-5
 title=Quality Circles Handbook | last= Hutchins | first=David (1983)|  |Pub PITMAN BOOKS 0–273 02644-5| PBK AND 0-273-02024-2 HBK
 A special tribute to Professor Kaoru Ishikawa 1990 | title= The man and his work | David Hutchins invited author of one chapter| Published by JUSE JAPAN + Special Committee| E 03(5379)1240
 title= Hoshin Kanri – the Strategic Approach to Continuous Improvement | last= Hutchins | first=David |  | 2008 | pub – GOWER PRESS  13:9780566087 400

References

External links 

Ishikawa Biography by the American Society for Quality
 Biography by De La Salle University

1915 births
1989 deaths
Japanese business theorists
Japanese statisticians
Quality experts
Recipients of the Order of the Sacred Treasure
University of Tokyo alumni
Academic staff of the University of Tokyo
20th-century Japanese economists
Imperial Japanese Navy officers